Guilherme Pontes Karam (8 October 1957 - 7 July 2016), best known as Guilherme Karan, was a Brazilian actor.

Biography
Son of the admiral and Minister of the Navy in the João Figueiredo government, Alfredo Karam and Lydiane Pontes Karam. Most of his work is comic, and was once a member of the Brazilian TV Pirata comedy show, one of the greatest hits of humor, screened by Globo TV. His most prominent work on TV is Butler Porfírio in telenovela Meu Bem, Meu Mal.

Disease
On 29 April 2005, he was robbed in a taxi, with his purse stolen. Karam physically suffered nothing, but the taxi driver was killed by reacting. Apparently, since the time of the assault Karam began to manifest symptoms of Machado-Joseph disease, a degenerative syndrome, also known as spinocerebellar ataxia type 3, which compromises motor coordination and control over muscles. Forced to switch to a wheelchair to get around, he has since stayed away from the stage and television. According to his father, Alfredo Karam, who gave statements to the Rio newspaper Extra, he inherited the illness of his mother, who died due to this same genetic anomaly. The other three brothers of the actor have already presented the disease - two already died.

Death
The actor died on 7 July 2016, at the Hospital Naval Marcílio Dias, as a result of the Machado-Joseph syndrome. His body was buried in Cemitério de São João Batista.

Works

Film

Television 
1984: Partido Alto - Políbio
1986: Tudo ou Nada (Manchete) - Jorjão
1986: Dona Beija (Manchete) - Hans Fucker
1987: Alta Estação - Renato
1988: Carmem (TV Manchete) - Trajano Paulo
1988-1990 TV Pirata - Various Characters
1990: Meu Bem, Meu Mal - Porfírio
1992: Perigosas Peruas - Hector
1995: Engraçadinha, seus amores e seus pecados - Ib Teixeira
1995: Explode Coração - Bebeto "A Jato"
1998: Hilda Furacão - João Dindim
1998: Pecado Capital - Jurandir
2001: O Clone - Raposão
2003: Sítio do Picapau Amarelo - Anibal
2005: América - Geraldito (final appearance)

References

External links

1957 births
2016 deaths
Deaths from neurodegenerative disease
Neurological disease deaths in Rio de Janeiro (state)
Male actors from Rio de Janeiro (city)
Brazilian male television actors
Brazilian male telenovela actors
Brazilian male film actors
Brazilian male stage actors
Brazilian people of Lebanese descent
20th-century Brazilian male actors
21st-century Brazilian male actors